Lendemeriella is a genus of crustose lichens in the subfamily Caloplacoideae of the family Teloschistaceae. It has nine species. The genus was circumscribed in 2020 by Sergey Kondratyuk, with Lendemeriella reptans assigned as the type species. The genus name honours the American lichenologist James Lendemer, who co-authored the type species in 2012 (as Caloplaca reptans).

Lendemeriella species have an arctic-alpine, boreal-montane, and Mediterranean distribution in the Northern Hemisphere. They grow on twigs, wood, bryophytes, the bark of deciduous trees as well as Siberian fir. They also grow on siliceous and calcareous rock in certain habitats.

Species
Lendemeriella aureopruinosa 
Lendemeriella borealis 
Lendemeriella dakotensis 
Lendemeriella exsecuta 
Lendemeriella lucifuga 
Lendemeriella nivalis 
Lendemeriella reptans 
Lendemeriella sorocarpa 
Lendemeriella tornoensis

References

Teloschistales
Teloschistales genera
Lichen genera
Taxa described in 2020
Taxa named by Sergey Kondratyuk